Eastern Medical College (EMC) is a private medical school in Bangladesh, established in 2005. The main campus is located beside the Dhaka–Chittagong Highway at Kabila in Burichang Upazila, in the Comilla District of Chittagong Division. It is affiliated with University of Chittagong and Chittagong Medical University.

It offers a five-year course of study leading to a Bachelor of Medicine, Bachelor of Surgery (MBBS) degree. A one-year internship after graduation is compulsory for  all graduates. The degree is recognized by the Bangladesh Medical and Dental Council.

The Kabila campus has an attached hospital with 600 beds.

History
Shah Md. Selim, Musleh Uddin Ahmed, Kalim Ullah, Abdul Quddus Akhand and Abdur Rouf established Eastern Medical College in 2005 and they are the founder directors.

Campus  

The main campus is located beside the Dhaka–Chittagong Highway at Kabila in Burichang Upazila, in the Comilla District of Chittagong Division. The Kabila campus has an attached 600-bed hospital.

Organization and administration
The college is affiliated with Chittagong University and Chittagong Medical University. The chairman of the college is Mr. Shah Md. Selim. The principal is Prof. Dr. Md. Kalim Ullah.

Academics
The college offers a five-year course of study, approved by the Bangladesh Medical and Dental Council (BMDC), leading to a Bachelor of Medicine, Bachelor of Surgery (MBBS) degree from Chittagong University or Chittagong Medical University. After passing the final professional examination, there is a compulsory one-year internship. The internship is a prerequisite for obtaining registration from the BMDC to practice medicine. In October 2014, the Ministry of Health and Family Welfare capped admission and tuition fees at private medical colleges at 1,990,000 Bangladeshi taka (US$25,750 as of 2014) total for their five-year courses.

Admission for Bangladeshis to the MBBS programme at all medical colleges in Bangladesh (government and private) is conducted centrally by the Directorate General of Health Services (DGHS). It administers a written multiple choice question exam simultaneously throughout the country. Candidates are admitted based primarily on their score on this test, although grades at Secondary School Certificate (SSC) and Higher Secondary School Certificate (HSC) level also play a part. As of July 2017, the college is allowed to admit 115 students annually.

See also
 List of medical colleges in Bangladesh
 List of Educational Institutions in Comilla

References

Medical colleges in Bangladesh
Hospitals in Bangladesh
Educational institutions established in 2005
2005 establishments in Bangladesh